Sheldon Darnell White (born March 1, 1965) is an American football executive and former National Football League cornerback. He played college football at Miami Ohio. He was drafted by the New York Giants in the third round of the 1988 NFL Draft and later played for the Detroit Lions and Cincinnati Bengals before retiring after the 1993 season.

White became a scout for the Lions in 1997 before being promoted to director of pro personnel in 2000. He was further promoted to vice president of pro personnel in 2009. He served as their interim general manager following the firing of Martin Mayhew in 2015. For the latter half of the 2010s, he served as the executive director of player personnel and recruiting for the Michigan State Spartans football team. White served as a scout for the Washington Football Team in 2021 before joining the Pittsburgh Steelers as their director of pro scouting the following year.

References

1965 births
Living people
American football cornerbacks
Cincinnati Bengals players
Detroit Lions executives
Detroit Lions scouts
Detroit Lions players
Miami RedHawks football players
New York Giants players
Pittsburgh Steelers executives
Washington Football Team scouts
Michigan State University people
Players of American football from Dayton, Ohio